Robert Pražák (2 December 1892 – 16 May 1966) was a Czechoslovak gymnast who competed for Czechoslovakia in the 1920 Summer Olympics and in the 1924 Summer Olympics. He was born and died in Plzeň.

In 1920 he was a member of the Czechoslovak gymnastic team which finished fourth in the team event. Four years later he won three silver medals in the individual all-around event, in the parallel bars competition, and in the rings event. At the 1924 Summer Olympics he also participated in the following events:

 Sidehorse vault - eighth place
 Vault - ninth place
 Horizontal bar - ninth place
 Pommel horse - 13th place
 Rope climbing - 13th place
 Team all-around - did not finish

References

1892 births
1966 deaths
Czechoslovak male artistic gymnasts
Olympic gymnasts of Czechoslovakia
Gymnasts at the 1920 Summer Olympics
Gymnasts at the 1924 Summer Olympics
Olympic silver medalists for Czechoslovakia
Sportspeople from Plzeň
Olympic medalists in gymnastics
Medalists at the 1924 Summer Olympics